Global Sweeteners Holdings Limited is a listed food company in Hong Kong. It is involved in the manufacture and sale of corn-based sweetener products in China, including corn syrup, corn syrup solids, and sugar alcohol.

The company was established in 2006. It is headquartered in Hong Kong and with its production facilities based in Changchun in Jilin Province and the Yangtze River Delta. It was spun off from Global Bio-Chem and listed on the Hong Kong Stock Exchange in 2007.

Link
Global Sweeteners Holdings Limited

See also
Global Bio-Chem

References

Companies listed on the Hong Kong Stock Exchange
Companies established in 2006
Companies based in Jilin
Food and drink companies of China
Food and drink companies of Hong Kong
Privately held companies of China